Agonidium wittei is a species of ground beetle in the subfamily Platyninae. It was described by Basilewsky in 1953.

References

wittei
Beetles described in 1953